James Patrick Blecksmith (September 26, 1980 – November 11, 2004) was an American military officer who was the first officer killed in  Operation Phantom Fury during Operation Iraqi Freedom II.

Biography
Blecksmith was born in Pasadena, California, September 26, 1980. He attended Valentine School, in San Marino, through 2nd grade, before his family moved to Seattle, Washington in 1989. After two years, the family returned to Southern California and Blecksmith enrolled at the Flintridge Preparatory School where he graduated in 1999. He lettered four years in track, two years in soccer and three years in football. He was named to three national All-American teams and was first-team all San Gabriel Valley. In track, he medaled, at the California Interscholastic Federation finals, in nine events and was all-(CIF) in his sophomore, junior and senior years, and was the Prep League Most Valuable Athlete in 1999. He served as 10th grade class president and was a member of the National Honor Society. Upon graduation from high school, Blecksmith entered the United States Naval Academy in June 1999.  Blecksmith's father, Edward, had served in the Marines in Vietnam.

United States Naval Academy
Although heavily recruited, Blecksmith saw limited action on the field for the Naval Academy. He matched the prototype of the 21st-century quarterback, 6-3, 216 with a rocket arm; but Navy ran a triple option offense, where the quarterback was more of a runner than a passer.  As a back-up quarterback, he completed 3 of his 4 passes, returned 2 kickoffs and caught a pass as a wide receiver during the Army–Navy Game in 2001.

Military career
After graduating from the Naval Academy in May 2003, Blecksmith accepted a commission as a 2nd Lieutenant in the United States Marine Corps. He completed The Basic School (TBS) and the Infantry Officer’s Course at Quantico, Virginia. In April 2004, he was assigned to the 3rd Battalion, 5th Marine Regiment of the 1st Marine Division and commanded the 3rd Platoon of India Company. The Battalion was deployed to Iraq on September 10, 2004.

Death
On March 31, 2004, Iraqi insurgents in Fallujah ambushed a convoy containing four American private military contractors from Blackwater USA, who were conducting delivery for food caterers ESS.

The contractors were dragged from their cars, beaten, and set on fire. Their burned corpses were then dragged through the streets before being hung over a bridge crossing the Euphrates.  Photographs of the event were released to news agencies worldwide, causing outrage in the United States, and prompting the announcement of a campaign to reestablish American control over the city.

This led to an unsuccessful US operation to recapture control of the city in Operation Vigilant Resolve, and then a successful recapture operation in the city in November 2004, called Operation Phantom Fury in English and Operation Al Fajr in Arabic. Blecksmith's India Company was the first to enter the city and start the house-to-house search operation in the Jolan District. On November 11, Blecksmith died from small arms fire while leading the third platoon in the clearing of these buildings. The bullet entered his left shoulder and was deflected down to his heart. Operation Phantom Fury resulted in the reputed death of over 1,350 insurgent fighters. Approximately 95 American Marines were killed, and more than 1,000 were wounded.

Legacy
On Veterans Day, November 11, 2006, two years to the day after Blecksmith's family heard he'd been killed in action in Iraq, the Marines renamed Pasadena's Marine Corps Reserve Center in his memory. The San Marino Tribune announced that proceeds from their annual 5K Run & Walk, scheduled for Monday, July 4,  will benefit the J.P. Blecksmith Leadership Foundation at Flintridge Preparatory School in La Cañada. On April 20, 2005 James Patrick Blecksmith was awarded the Purple Heart and the Bronze Star for his courage and bravery.

In a season 4 episode of NCIS, actor Mark Harmon wears a J.P. Blecksmith memorial t-shirt in the episode "In The Dark." In the September 29, 2009 episode of NCIS "Reunion", Mark Harmon (Gibbs) wears a J.P. Blecksmith memorial t-shirt in an early scene.

References

1980 births
2004 deaths
American football wide receivers
United States Marine Corps personnel of the Iraq War
Players of American football from Pasadena, California
United States Marine Corps officers
United States Naval Academy alumni
Navy Midshipmen football players
American military personnel killed in the Iraq War
Deaths by firearm in Iraq